The 2018 IIHF Women's Challenge Cup of Asia Division I was an international women's ice hockey tournament run by the International Ice Hockey Federation. The tournament took place between 6 and 9 March 2018 at the Empire City Ice Arena in Kuala Lumpur, Malaysia. This edition marks the return of the Division I tournament after no division tournament was held in 2017.

The tournament was contested by four nations. Host Malaysia won the tournament after winning over the United Arab Emirates in their last round robin match.

Round robin

Final standings

References

External links
Tournament page at IIHF.com

IIHF Women's Challenge Cup of Asia
IIHF Women's Challenge Cup of Asia
IIHF Women's Challenge Cup of Asia
International ice hockey competitions hosted by Malaysia
2017–18 in Asian ice hockey
March 2018 sports events in Asia